Erycina may refer to:
 Erycina (bivalve), a genus in the family Lasaeidae
 Erycina (plant), a flowering plant genus in the family Orchidaceae
 Venus Erycina ("Venus of Eryx"), a name for the Roman goddess Venus

See also 

 Erycinae, a subfamily of snakes
 Temple of Venus Erycina